DXOM (91.7 FM), broadcasting as 91.7 Happy FM, is a radio station owned by the Notre Dame Broadcasting Corporation in the Philippines. The studios are located at the NDBC Bldg., General Santos Drive, Koronadal City, while the transmitter is located at Roxas Mountain Range, Brgy. Paraiso, Koronadal City. It operates daily from 4:00 AM to 12:00 MN.

DXOM is the pioneer FM station in Koronadal, inaugurated in July 1993. From 1998 to 2012, it carried the brand Hot Radio. On August 25, 2012, the station rebranded as Happy FM.

References

External links

Radio stations in South Cotabato
Radio stations established in 1993